Guerra de Titanes (2008) ("War of the Titans") was the twelfth annual Guerra de Titanes professional wrestling show promoted by AAA. The show took place on December 6, 2008 in Orizaba, Mexico, the same venue used for the 2006 and 2007 events. The Main event featured a Ladder match for the vacant AAA Mega Championship between El Mesias and El Zorro and saw Mesias win the match to become a two time champion. In addition to the main event the show featured a Steel Cage Match Lucha de Apuestas where the last man left in the cage would have his hair shaved off. The participants in the cage match were brothers El Brazo and Brazo de Plata as well as Pirata Morgan, Electroshock, Super Fly and El Elegido and saw El Brazo shaved bald as a result of his loss. As is tradition with AAA major events the wrestlers compete inside a hexagonal wrestling ring and not the four sided ring the promotion uses for television events and House shows.

Production

Background
Starting in 1997 the Mexican professional wrestling, company AAA has held a major wrestling show late in the year, either November or December, called Guerra de Titanes ("War of the Titans"). The show often features championship matches or Lucha de Apuestas or bet matches where the competitors risked their wrestling mask or hair on the outcome of the match. In Lucha Libre the Lucha de Apuetas match is considered more prestigious than a championship match and a lot of the major shows feature one or more Apuesta matches. The Guerra de Titanes show is hosted by a new location each year, emanating from cities such as Madero, Chihuahua, Chihuahua, Mexico City, Guadalajara, Jalisco and more. The 2008 Guerra de Titanes show was the eleventh show in the series.

Storylines
The Guerra de Titanes show featured six professional wrestling matches with different wrestlers involved in pre-existing, scripted feuds, plots, and storylines. Wrestlers were portrayed as either heels (referred to as rudos in Mexico, those that portray the "bad guys") or faces (técnicos in Mexico, the "good guy" characters) as they followed a series of tension-building events, which culminated in a wrestling match or series of matches.

Results

References

2008 in professional wrestling
Guerra de Titanes
2008 in Mexico
December 2008 events in Mexico